The 1993 NCAA Division I women's soccer tournament was the 12th annual single-elimination tournament to determine the national champion of NCAA Division I women's collegiate soccer. The championship game was played at Fetzer Field in Chapel Hill, North Carolina during December 1993.

North Carolina defeated George Mason (the last team to defeat the Tar Heels in a College Cup Final) in the final, 6–0, to win their eleventh national title. Coached by Anson Dorrance, the Tar Heels again finished the season undefeated, 23–0. This would go on to become the eighth of North Carolina's record nine consecutive national titles (1986–1994). It also comprised the Tar Heels' ten-year unbeaten streak that ran from the 1984 final all the way until the 1994 season.

The most outstanding offensive player was again Mia Hamm from North Carolina, and the most outstanding defensive player was Skye Eddy, from George Mason. Hamm was also the tournament's leading scorer (6 goals, 4 assists). Hamm and Eddy, along with ten other players, were named to the All-tournament team.

Qualification

All Division I women's soccer programs were eligible to qualify for the tournament. For the first time since 1984, the tournament field expanded, increasing from 12 to 16 teams.

Teams

Bracket

All-tournament team
Skye Eddy, George Mason (most outstanding defensive player)
Danielle Egan, North Carolina
Mia Hamm, North Carolina (most outstanding offensive player)
Christine Ho, George Mason
Angela Kelly, North Carolina
Carmel Murphy, Stanford
Tammy Pearman, George Mason
Sarah Rafanelli, Stanford
Nicole Roberts, Massachusetts
Zola Springer, North Carolina
Rita Tower, North Carolina
Tisha Venturini, North Carolina

See also 
 NCAA Division II Women's Soccer Championship
 NCAA Division III Women's Soccer Championship

References

NCAA Division I Women's Soccer Tournament
NCAA Women's Soccer Championship
 
NCAA Division I Women's Soccer Tournament
NCAA Division I Women's Soccer Tournament
NCAA Division I Women's Soccer Tournament
Women's sports in North Carolina